Almoharín is a municipality located in the province of Cáceres, Extremadura, Spain. According to the 2005 census (INE), the municipality has a population of 2050 inhabitants. 

The village's economy is primarily agricultural, with many inhabitants having fincas of olives and figs. Almoharin is known as the 'Fig Capital of the World' on account of these figs, which are green and smooth-textured. Both dried figs and chocolate figs are exported worldwide. The village also has a cheese-making workshop where visitors can make their own cheese - after milking the sheep. There is an accompanying exhibition of the history of sheep and cheese-making in the area.

Almoharin has a 16th-century church, and a traditional plaza. The Roman bridge, just outside the village, is the oldest architectural remains in the area.

References

External links 

 

Municipalities in the Province of Cáceres